W*A*L*T*E*R is a 1984 American television pilot for the third spin-off of M*A*S*H that was never picked up. It starred Gary Burghoff, who reprised his M*A*S*H character.

The episode chronicles the adventures of Corporal Walter "Radar" O'Reilly after he returns home from the Korean War. He is no longer calling himself "Radar" and has moved away from Iowa after he sent his mother to live with his aunt. Settling in St. Louis, Missouri, by the beginning of the series he has become a police officer.

Plot
No longer using his army nickname "Radar", Walter O'Reilly is now a rookie policeman living in St. Louis with his colleague and cousin Wendell Micklejohn.  As they get ready for work they are watching the start of a television interview by Clete Roberts, who is following up with various former staff from the 4077th; the previous week Roberts had interviewed Hawkeye Pierce, and this week Walter's interview was being televised. At the police department and through a store front window, Walter and Wendell catch bits of the interview, giving viewers of the pilot a chance to bridge the events of M*A*S*H and AfterMASH with W*A*L*T*E*R.

In flashbacks during the interview scenes, viewers learn that Walter had returned home to Iowa but failed at farming and was forced to sell the farm and livestock and then he sent his mother to live with his aunt. After marrying his bride in River Bend (shown in an episode of AfterMASH), she left him for his best friend during their honeymoon in St. Louis.  Having hit rock bottom, a wandering Walter went to a drug store to buy an overdose of sleeping pills (and aspirin as sleeping pills gave him a headache), but the drugstore clerk, Victoria, dissuaded him and they became friends. Wendell then helped Walter get a job with the city police. Walter solves a dispute between two strippers, and gets his wallet back from a young would-be thief whose father was killed in Korea.

Cast
 Gary Burghoff as Officer Walter O'Reilly
 Ray Buktenica as Officer Wendell Micklejohn
 Victoria Jackson as Victoria
 Noble Willingham as Sergeant Sowell
 Meeno Peluce as Elston Krennick
 Clete Roberts as The Interviewer 
 Sam Scarber as Haskell
 Lyman Ward as Bigelow
 Sarah Abrell as Judith Crane
 Larry Cedar as Zipkin
 Francine Gable as Pretty Girl
 Victoria Carroll as Bubbles Sincere
 June Berry as Dixie Devoe
 Bobby Ramsen as The Singer
 Dick Miller as The Theater Owner

Relationship with M*A*S*H
In the pilot episode of W*A*L*T*E*R, only three main characters from the original series were ever mentioned by Walter O'Reilly and they were Lieutenant Colonel Henry Blake, Captain Benjamin "Hawkeye" Pierce and Major Margaret "Hot Lips" Houlihan. Walter O'Reilly had kept a photograph of all of his former Army buddies from the 4077th MASH unit as a reminder from the good old days in his wallet.

Production

Timeline
The episode takes place after the series finale of M*A*S*H, and a two-part guest appearance on AfterMASH, in which Radar was forced to leave the family farm.

Broadcast difficulties
Since the pilot was never picked up by CBS as a series, it was shown as a "CBS Special Presentation" on July 17, 1984. It was shown once in the Eastern and Central time zones of the United States, but pre-empted on the West Coast by CBS News coverage of the Democratic National Convention. This is the only known broadcast of the pilot.

References

External links
 Full pilot
 
 Television Obscurities – W*A*L*T*E*R

1984 American television episodes
20th Century Fox Television films
1980s American television specials
American television spin-offs
CBS television specials
Films directed by Bill Bixby
Television shows set in Missouri
Television pilots not picked up as a series
M*A*S*H
Television series by 20th Century Fox Television
July 1984 events in the United States